Ian Purkayastha (born August 30, 1992) is the founder of Regalis Foods, an importer, distributor, and manufacturer of rare and exotic foods, based in New York City, Chicago, and Dallas. Regalis specializes in fresh truffles, caviar, uni, live exotic seafood, and wild foraged edibles. Regalis presently works with the vast majority of the Michelin-starred restaurant community in the United States, as well as operating a direct-to-consumer web platform: extending the same quality ingredients to curious consumers at home. 

Ian was born in Houston, Texas, and moved to Arkansas as a teenager. At 15, he started foraging for mushrooms and wild greens with his uncle, in Fayetteville, Arkansas. After tasting his first truffle, Ian became obsessed with wild foods, and began cold-calling local restaurants and chefs in neighboring cities. This early foray into purveying and distributing led Ian to New York City, where he founded Regalis. 

In February 2017, Ian released a memoir, Truffle Boy: My Unexpected Journey Through the Exotic Food Underground, through Hachette Books.

Career 
In 2008, at the age of fifteen, Ian founded a foraging, importing, and distributing company, primarily working with restaurants in Arkansas, Oklahoma, and Texas. In 2010, he moved to New Jersey, working as the North American Sales Director for an Italian truffle company. In 2012, he founded Regalis, initially operating primarily in New York City. As the years passed, Regalis forged partnerships in Chicago and Dallas, where there are now additional Regalis offices and warehouses. In 2016, Forbes Magazine listed Ian among their 30 Under 30, a year before his memoir was released.  

In March 2020, RegalisFoods.com launched a direct-to-consumer luxury foods e-commerce platform. Today, Regalis remains a national leader among luxury food brands in the United States, and collaborates with a wide range of well-known chefs and lifestyle businesses. In some form, roughly 80% of the Michelin starred restaurant community works with Regalis. In addition to sourcing and selling ingredients, Regalis has a wide range of branded, finished products, including honeys and preserves, caviar and roes, and wild edibles.

To date, Ian has been profiled by the New York Times, The New Yorker, The Wall Street Journal, Forbes Magazine, Food & Wine, Vice Media, W Magazine, and CNN's Great Big Story.

References

American chefs
American male chefs
Living people
1992 births